William Hoare of Bath  (c. 1707 – 12 December 1792) was a British portraitist, painter and printmaker. From c. 1740 to 1759, he was the leading oil portraitist at Bath, Somerset, until Thomas Gainsborough arrived in the town. Noted for his pastels, he was a foundation member of the Royal Academy.

Life
Born near Eye, Suffolk, Hoare received a gentleman's education in Faringdon. He showed an aptitude for drawing and was sent to London to study under Giuseppe Grisoni, who had left Florence for London in 1715. When Grisoni returned to Italy in 1728, Hoare went with him, travelling to Rome and continuing his studies under the direction of Francesco Imperiali. He remained in Rome for nine years, returning to London in 1737/8.

Failing to establish himself in London, Hoare settled in Bath, an expanding spa town popular with the wealthier classes. He obtained numerous commissions, the most important being for official portraits of social leaders of the day (including George Frideric Handel) and political men (e.g., Prime Ministers Robert Walpole and William Pitt, 1st Earl of Chatham, c.1754). There are several versions of most of these, suggesting that he had a studio, and they were further publicised by the production of mezzotints by leading engravers of the day. Hoare himself was a delicate etcher and published a number of private plates, mostly of family and friends, including a Miss Hoare (probably Mary), Christopher Anstey and the 3rd Duke of Beaufort. His pastels were influenced by Rosalba Carriera.

William Hoare was the first fashionable portraitist to settle in Bath, and he was the leading portraitist there until the arrival of Thomas Gainsborough in 1759. He remained the favourite of his powerful patron the Duke of Newcastle, his family, followers and political associates. Included amongst his other important patrons were the Earls of Pembroke and Chesterfield, and the Duke of Beaufort. With Gainsborough and Joshua Reynolds, he was a founding member of the Royal Academy.

Hoare was closely involved with the running of the Royal Mineral Water Hospital in Bath from 1742. He served as a governor of the hospital, and became acquainted with Bath's notable visitors and the neighbouring landed families. Chalmers described him as 'an ingenious and amiable English painter'. He died at Bath on 12 December 1792.

His son, Prince Hoare, achieved fame as a painter and dramatist. His daughter Mary Hoare was also a noted painter.

Works 
Hoare's oil painting Dr Oliver and Mr Pierce examining patients with Paralysis, Rheumatism and Leprosy hung prominently at the Royal Mineral Water Hospital until 2019, when it was transferred to a new building at Bath's Royal United Hospital site.

Notes

Bibliography

 

 Newby, Evelyn (2006a) "William Hoare (of Bath)", Grove Art Online, Oxford University Press, retrieved on 15 August 2007 (subscription required)
 Newby, Evelyn (2006b) "Hoare, William (1707/8–1792)", Oxford Dictionary of National Biography, Oxford University Press, online edn, accessed 15 Aug 2007
Neil Jeffares, Dictionary of pastellists before 1800, online edition

External links

 
 
 
 William Hoare's portraits – National Portrait Gallery
 Hoare's work held by the Royal National Hospital for Rheumatic Diseases – Art at the Royal United Hospital
 Evelyn Newby Archive - Research on William Hoare of Bath (1707–1792)

1707 births
1792 deaths
18th-century English painters
18th-century English male artists
Artists from Bath, Somerset
English male painters
English portrait painters
People from Eye, Suffolk
Royal Academicians